The 2021 Biella Challenger Indoor II was a professional tennis tournament played on hard courts. It was the 2nd edition of the tournament which was part of the 2021 ATP Challenger Tour. It took place in Biella, Italy between 15 and 21 February 2021.

Singles main-draw entrants

Seeds

 1 Rankings are as of 8 February 2021.

Other entrants
The following players received wildcards into the singles main draw:
  Stefano Napolitano
  Luca Nardi
  Giulio Zeppieri

The following player received entry into the singles main draw as a special exempt:
  Illya Marchenko

The following players received entry into the singles main draw as alternates:
  Ernests Gulbis
  Lukáš Lacko

The following players received entry from the qualifying draw:
  Raúl Brancaccio
  Blaž Kavčič
  Constant Lestienne
  Matteo Viola

The following player received entry as a lucky loser:
  Hiroki Moriya

Champions

Singles

 Kwon Soon-woo def.  Lorenzo Musetti 6–2, 6–3.

Doubles

 Hugo Nys /  Tim Pütz def.  Lloyd Glasspool /  Harri Heliövaara 7–6(7–4), 6–3.

References

2021 ATP Challenger Tour
2021 in Italian tennis
February 2021 sports events in Italy
Biella Challenger Indoor